Alessandro Bertolotti (born in 1960) is an Italian writer and photographer.

Life
He has worked as a director of variety shows for the Italian television channel RAI for twenty-five years. He is also a photographer of female nudes and author of two works on Capri. His photographs are included in the archives of the Bibliothèque nationale de France. He is one of the largest collectors of erotic books and nude photographs in Europe. A portion of his book collection has been exhibited in the fall of 2007 at the Maison européenne de la photographie in Paris. His Books of Nudes (2007), according to ARTnews, "features published studies by photographers, both famous and forgotten, who have taken the naked body as their subject".

Selected works

References

Further reading

 
 
 Anne Sauvagnargues, Parures de nus, Liberation, 8 novembre 2007
 Silvana Turzio, Effetti concettuali del nudo in pagina, Alias Manifesto, 24 nov. 2007.
 Nude Visions. 150 years of nude photographers, Keherer Verlag, 2009, 
 Hans-Michael Koetze, Photographers A-Z, Taschen, 2011.

External links
 (fr) Bertolotti et sa bibliothèque rose d’enfer

1960 births
Italian photographers
Living people